Zollern may refer to:

 House of Hohenzollern, a German former royal dynasty
 Beatrix of Zollern (1362–1414), wife of Duke Albert III of Austria
 Count of Zollern, including a list of people with the title
 County of Zollern, a medieval county of in South West Germany
 Zollern II/IV Colliery, a disused mine in the city of Dortmund

See also
 Zollernalbkreis, a district in Baden-Württemberg, Germany